Nakhon Chum is a subdistrict in the Nakhon Thai District of Phitsanulok Province, Thailand.

Geography
Nakhon Chum lies in the Nan Basin, which is part of the Chao Phraya Watershed.

Administration
The following is a list of the subdistrict's mubans (villages):

Temples
The following is a list of temples in Nakhon Chum:
Wat Na Mueang (วัดนาเมือง) in muban 3
Wat Na Thung Yai (วัดนาทุ่งใหญ่) in muban 1
Wat Na Lan Kao (วัดนาลานข้าว) in muban 2
Wat Na Kum Khan (วัดนาขุนคัน) in muban 5
Wat Na Fong Daeng (วัดนาฟองแดง) in muban 7

References

Tambon of Phitsanulok province
Populated places in Phitsanulok province